Maziar Partow (November 13, 1933 – January 22, 2014) was one of the first Iranian cinematographers and had worked as a cameraman on numerous Iranian films. He directed a few movies and edited several more, and was most well known by his title as Director of Photography.

Partow died January 22, 2014, in California.

Filmography
 Ruz-e vaghe'e (1995)... aka The Fateful Day
 Avinar (1991)
 Bazgasht-e ghahraman (1990)... aka Return of the Hero (International: English title: informal title)
 Jostejoogar (1989)... aka The Searcher (International: English title)
 Jafar Khan az farang bargashte (1985)
 Kafsh-haye Mirza Norooz (1985)... aka Mirza Norooz's Shoes (International: English title)
 Toghian (1985)
 Barzakhiha (1982)
 Zemzeme-ye mohabbat (1980)
 Gorg-e bizar (1973)
 Baba Shamal (1971)
 Toughi (1971)
 Shahr-e hert (1970)
 Gheisar (1969)
 Khaneye kenare darya (1969)
 Zan-e khoon-asham (1967)
 Hashem khan (1966)
 The Poppy Is Also a Flower (1966)

References

External links
 

Iranian cinematographers
1933 births
2014 deaths